Lý Khuê (died 968) was a warlord of Vietnam during the Period of the 12 Warlords. 

He occupied Siêu Loại (mordern Thuận Thành District, Bắc Ninh Province), and titled himself Lý Lãng Công (李郎公). 

In 968, he was defeated by Lưu Cơ, a general of Đinh Bộ Lĩnh.

References

968 deaths
10th-century Vietnamese people
People from Hưng Yên Province
Anarchy of the 12 Warlords